Nanyuanmen Subdistrict is a subdistrict of Beilin District, Xi'an.

See also
List of township-level divisions of Shaanxi

References

Beilin District, Xi'an
Township-level divisions of Shaanxi
Subdistricts of the People's Republic of China